Pop Goes the Easel is a 1962 British documentary directed by Ken Russell commissioned by the BBC's Monitor arts' television series. It is a portrait of pop artists Peter Blake, Derek Boshier, Pauline Boty and Peter Phillips in a style owing a little to their own.

References

External links
Pop Goes the Easel at IMDb
Monitor: Pop Goes the Easel, BBC website
Pop Goes the Easel at Letterbox DVD

1962 in British television
1962 television films
1962 films
Films directed by Ken Russell
1960s British films